Saas Bahu is a Pakistani drama series, produced by Asif Raza Mir and Babar Javed under their production banner A&B Entertainment. The drama airs  weekly on Geo Entertainment every Thursday. It stars Hassaan Ahmed, Saman Ansari and Sajida Syed in lead roles.

Plot 
Saas Bahu lays emphasis on the harsh reality of society where women often destroy harmony in not only their own life but also in the lives encircling them. It touches upon the fact that at times, close relations become the reason of  distress in the lives of a happily married couple.

Part of this drama serial also indicates that most of the miseries men go through in life are due to the politics women play in their lives. It captures the antics and politics women involve themselves in.

The writer's work seems to be influenced with the saying: "Men can hurt my body, but women scar my soul", which is said to be experience by all but denied by many.

Cast
Saman Ansari
Hassaan Ahmed
Sajida Syed
Salma Zafar
Omer Shahzad
Asim Mehmood
Munawwar Saeed
Erum Azam

Production
Serial was initially titled as Dil Aashna Hai, but later changed by makers. The shooting of the serial took place in Karachi. It is directed by Syed Ramish Rizvi who direct serials like Meri Maa and Choti Choti Khushiyaan which were also produced by A&B Entertainment. It is the first time Saman Ansari played the lead.

References

Geo TV original programming
2015 Pakistani television series debuts
2016 Pakistani television series endings
Urdu-language telenovelas